(Main list of acronyms)



 S
 (s) Siemens
 South
 Sulphur/Sulfur

S0–9
 S followed by a number is used to denote various German and Austrian S-train lines.
 S4C – (i) Sianel Pedwar Cymru (Welsh, "Channel Four Wales")
 S3 - (i) Alternative to SSS (e.g. Amazon S3)

SA
 sa – (s) Sanskrit language (ISO 639-1 code)
 SA
 (i) Salvation Army
 (s) Sand (METAR Code)
 Saudi Arabia (ISO 3166 and FIPS 10-4 country's code digram)
 (i) Sexaholics Anonymous
 (i) sine anno (Latin, "without year")
 Single Adult, a designation in the LDS Church for unmarried individuals 18 and older
 Situational awareness
 South Africa
 (i/s) South Australia (postal symbol)
 (i) Standards Australia
 Sturmabteilung (German, "Storm Detachment", Nazi forerunner and rival of SS)
 S.A. – designation for a corporation in many European countries; see article for meanings
 SAA
 (i) Saudi Arabian Airlines, former name of Saudia
 Sex Addicts Anonymous
 South African Airways
 Southern Athletic Association
 Standards Association of Australia, a former name of Standards Australia
 SAAB – (a) Svenska Aeroplan AB (Swedish aircraft manufacturer; also refers to its former auto manufacturing arm)
 SAAFR – (a/i) Standard use Army Aircraft Flight Route ("safer")
 SAAMI – (a) Sporting Arms and Ammunition Manufacturers' Institute ("sammy")
 SAARC – (i) South Asian Association for Regional Cooperation
 SAB – (i) Soprano Alto Baritone
 Sabena – (a) Société anonyme belge d'exploitation de la navigation aérienne (French for "Belgian Company for Exploiting Aerial Navigation", 1923–2001)
 SABIC – (p) Saudi Basic Industries Corporation
 SABR – (a) Society for American Baseball Research
 SAC
 (a) Standards Activity Committee (of SISO)
 U.S. Strategic Air Command (1946–1992)
 SACAT – (a) Semi Attended Customer Activated Terminal (Supermarket checkout)
 SACEUR – (p) Supreme Allied Commander EURope
 SACF - Semi Automatic Capsule Filler source
 SACLANT – (p) Supreme Allied Commander atLANTic
 SACLOS – (a) Semi-Automatic Command to Line of Sight
 SAD
 (s) Safford Regional Airport (IATA code)
 (a) Seasonal Affective Disorder
 Situational Awareness Display
 SADD – (a) originally Students Against Drunk Driving, now Students Against Destructive Decisions (U.S. national school-related group)
 SADL
 (a) Situation Awareness Data Link ("saddle")
 Structural Architecture Description Language
 SADT - (i) Substance Abuse Day Treatment
 SAE
 (i) Society of Automotive Engineers
 Stamped addressed envelope
 SAFER – (a) Steel And Foam Energy Reduction
 SAFETY – (a) Stopping Adults Facilitating the Exploitation of Today's Youth
 SAFICT – (a) Software Agents as Facilitators of Interoperability in Collective Training
 sag – (s) Sango language (ISO 639-2 code)
 SAG – (i) Screen Actors Guild
 SAGAT – (a) Situation Awareness Global Assessment Technique
 SAGE – (a) Semi-Automatic Ground Environment (simulation)
 SAHB – (a) Sensational Alex Harvey Band
 SAIC – (i) Science Applications International Corporation
 SALT
 (a/i) Save A Life Today (SALT) Alert; Emergency Contact System
 (a) Southern African Large Telescope
 Strategic Arms Limitation Talks
 SAM
 (a) Sequential-Access Memory
 Sociedad Aeronáutica de Medellín
 Surface-to-Air Missile
 Sambo – (p/a) Samooborona bez oruzhiya (Russian: "Самооборона без оружия", literally "self-defense without weapons")
 SAML – (a) Security Assertion Markup Language ("sam-ell")
 SANZAAR – (a) South Africa, New Zealand, Australia and Argentina Rugby
 san
 (s) Sanskrit language (ISO 639-2 code)
 (a) Storage Area Network
 SAR
 (s) Saudi riyal (ISO 4217 currency code)
 (a) Search And Rescue
 Special Administrative Region
 Synthetic Aperture Radar
 SARA
 (a) Southeastern Association for Research in Astronomy
 Scientific Atlanta Resident Application
 Scottish Amateur Rowing Association
 Southern African Railway Association
 State Administration for Religious Affairs
 SARP – (a) Search And Rescue Processor
 SARR – (i/a) Search And Rescue Repeater
 SARS – (a) Severe Acute Respiratory Syndrome
 SART
 (a) Search and Rescue Transponder
 Situational Awareness Rating Technique
 SARU – (i) South African Rugby Union
 SAS
 (i) Scandinavian Airlines System
 Second Avenue Subway
 Situational Awareness System
 Special Air Service
 Studies, Analysis and Simulation
 Side Angle Side
 (a) Statistical Analysis System (original meaning; SAS Institute Inc. has evolved far beyond that scope)
 SASE – (i) Self-Addressed Stamped Envelope
 SASO – (a) Stability and Support Operations
 SASOL – (p) Suid Afrikaanse Steenkool en Oli.e. (Afrikaans, "South African Coal and Oil")
 SAT
 (i) formerly Scholastic Aptitude Test and Scholastic Assessment Test; now known solely by the initials
 Small Arms Trainer
 SATB – (i) Soprano Alto Tenor bass
 SATNAV – (p) Satellite Navigation (Increasingly common GPS based system in new vehicles)
 SATs – (a) Standard Assessment Tasks and other similar terms describing tests used in English schools; see National Curriculum assessment#Terminology
 SAU – (s) Saudi Arabia (ISO 3166 trigram)
 SAVAK – (a) Sazamane Etelaat va Amniate Kechvar (Iranian "Security and Intelligence Service")
 SAW
 (i) ṣallā -llāhu ʿalayhī (wa-ʾālihī) wa-sallama (Arabic: صَلَّىٰ ٱللَّٰهُ عَلَيْهِ وَآلِهِ وَسَلَّمَ, "God bless him [and his family] and grant him peace"), an honorific suffix within Islam for Muhammad
 (a) Submerged arc welding
 Squad Automatic Weapon
 Surface acoustic wave
 SAWE – (a) Society of Allied Weight Engineers
 SAWS – (i) alternate form of the Islamic honorific suffix for Muhammad (see SAW)

SB
 Sb – (s) Antimony (Latin Stibium)
 SbA - Stibarsen, an alloy of antimony and arsenic
 SB
 (i) Sexy Bitch
 Sexy Bastard
 Sexy Boy (disambiguation)
 (s) Solomon Islands (ISO 3166 digram)
 (i) Special Warfare Boat Operator
 SBA
 (i) Santa Barbara Airport
 Simulation-Based Acquisition
 Small Business Administration
 Sovereign Base Area
 Student bar association
 SBB – (i) German for the Swiss Federal Railways
 SBC
 (i) Sensotronic Brake Control
 Single-Board Computer
 Southern Baptist Convention
 Sun Belt Conference (US college sports)
 SBCCOM – (p) U.S. Army Soldier and Biological Chemical Command (disbanded 2003)
 SBCS – (i) Single-Byte Character Set
 SBCT – (i) Stryker Brigade Combat Team
 SBD
 (s) Solomon Islands dollar (ISO 4217 currency code)
 Silent But Deadly
 SBP
 (i) Samahang Basketbol ng Pilipinas (Filipino, "Basketball Federation of the Philippines")
 U.S. School Breakfast Program
 Society of Business Practitioners
 State Bank of Pakistan
 SBS
 (i) Special Boat Service
 Special Broadcasting Service
 Seoul Broadcasting System
 SBW
 (i) Sonny Bill Williams (New Zealand dual-code rugby player)

SC
 sc – (s) Sardinian language (ISO 639-1 code)
 Sc – (s) Scandium
 SC
 (s) Cruiser Submarine (US Navy hull classification) c Saint Kitts and Nevis (FIPS 10-4 country code; from Saint Christopher)
 Seychelles (ISO 3166 digram)
 South Carolina (postal symbol)
 SCA
 (i) Service Contract Act
 Sexual Compulsives Anonymous
 Society for Creative Anachronism
 SCAP – (a) Supreme Commander Allied Powers (Allied occupation of Japan)
 sccm – (s) Standard cubic centimetre per minute (unit of measurement of fluid flow)
 sccs – (s) Standard cubic centimetre per second (unit of measurement of fluid flow)
 scfh – (s) Standard cubic foot per hour (unit of measurement of fluid flow)
 scfm – (s) Standard cubic foot per minute (unit of measurement of fluid flow)
 scfs – (s) Standard cubic foot per second (unit of measurement of fluid flow)
 SCG – (s) Serbia and Montenegro (ISO 3166 trigram; defunct since 2006)
 SCHIMS – (i) Soldier Combat Helmet Identification Marking System
 SCHIP – (a) State Children's Health Insurance Program (U.S.; often pronounced "ess-chip")
 SciFi – Science Fiction
 sCJD – (i) Sporadic Creutzfeldt–Jakob disease
 SCM – (i) Surface Contamination Module
 SCMODS – (s) State, County, Municipal Offender Data System
 SCN – (p) Suprachiasmatic Nucleus
 SCNT – (i) Somatic Cell Nuclear Transfer
 SCO
 (i) Santa Cruz Operation (initials later used by SCO Group)
 (s) Scotland (FIFA trigram; not eligible for an ISO 3166 or IOC trigram)
 (a) Shanghai Cooperation Organisation
 SCOTUS – (a) Supreme Court of the United States
 SCR – (s) Seychelles rupee (ISO 4217 currency code)
 SCRAM – (a) Safety Control Rod Axe Man
 SCS
 (i) Scan Correlated Shift
 Soil Conservation Service
 SCSI
 (a) Small Computer System Interface ("scuzzy")
 (i) Strategic and Combat Studies Institute
 SCT – (s) Scattered Sky (METAR Code)
 SCTP – (i) Stream Control Transmission Protocol
 Scuba – (a) Self Contained Underwater Breathing Apparatus
 SCUF – Slow Continuous Ultrafiltration
 SCUFN – (i) Sub-Committee on Undersea Feature Names (of GEBCO)

SD
 sd – (s) Sindhi language (ISO 639-1 code)
 SD
 (i) Secure Digital (memory card format)
 Sheriff's department
 Smoke/Decontamination
 (s) South Dakota (postal symbol)
 Sudan (ISO 3166 digram)
 SDC
 (i) Shaft Driven Compressor
 U.S. Army Strategic Defense Command (1985–1992)
 SDG – (s) Sudanese pound (ISO 4217 currency code)
 SDG – (i) Sum Dum Goy - greasy spoon chinese restaurant
 SDH – (i) Synchronous Digital Hierarchy
 SDHC – (i) Secure Digital High Capacity
 SDI – see entry
 SDN – (s) Sudan (ISO 3166 trigram)
 SDO – (i) Scattered Disc Object
 SDP – (i) Social Democratic Party (European politics)
 SDR – (i) Strategic Defence Review
 SDRAM – (i) Synchronous Dynamic Random-Access Memory ("ess-dee-ram")
 SDS – (i) Students for a Democratic Society
 SDSS – (i) Sloan Digital Sky Survey
 SDXC – (p) Secure Digital eXtended Capacity

SE
 se – (s) Northern Sami language (ISO 639-1 code)
 Se – (s) Selenium
 SE
 (s) Seychelles (FIPS 10-4 country code)
 (i) Societas Europaea (form of business organization in the EU)
 South-east
 (s) Sweden (ISO 3166 digram)
 (i) Synthetic Environment
 System Engineering
 SEAD – (i) Suppression of Enemy Air Defence(s)
 SEADI – (i) Senior Executioner of Approved Driving Instructors
 SEAFDEC – (p) Southeast Asian Fisheries Development Center
 SEAL – (p) SEa-Air-Land
 SEAT – (a) Sociedad Española de Automóviles de Turismo (Spanish for "Spanish Touring Car Company")
 SEATO – (a) Southeast Asia Treaty Organization
 SeaWiFS – (p) Sea-Viewing Wide Field of View Sensor (satellite instrument)
 SEC
 (i) U.S. Securities and Exchange Commission
 (p) Security
 Southeastern Conference
 SECaaS - (p) Security-as-a-Service
 SECAM – (a) Séquentiel couleur à mémoire (French for "Colour Sequential with Memory"; TV standard, cf. NTSC, PAL)
 SECDEF – (p) (U.S.) Secretary of Defense
 SED – (i) CERDEC Software Engineering Directorate
 SEDRIS – (a) Synthetic Environment Data Representation and Interchange Specification
 SEE – (a) Small Emplacement Excavator
 SEG – (i) Society of Exploration Geophysicists
 SEG – (i) Special Escort Group
 SEK – (s) Swedish krona (ISO 4217 currency code)
 Selkent – (p) South East London & Kent Bus Company
 SELT – (a) Single Ended Line Test (ing)
 SEM
 (i/a) Sensor Employment Manager
 Switch to Email Mode, i.e. stop texting as it is more disruptive by making a sound or vibrating and email instead, for a given time
 SEN
 (s) Senegal (ISO 3166 trigram)
 (i) Small Extension Node
 SEP
 (i) Somebody Else's Problem
 Spherical Error Probable
 System Enhancement Package
 System Engineering Plan
 SEPTA – (i) Southeastern Pennsylvania Rapid-Transit Authority
 SERE – (i) Survival, Evasion, Resistance and Escape
 SESSPE – (a) Submarine Escape and Surface Survival Personnel Equipment
 SET – (p) Staphylococcal EnteroToxin
 SETI – (a) Search for ExtraTerrestrial Intelligence
 SETAC – (a) Society for Environmental Toxicology and Chemistry
 SEU
 (i) Single Event Upset (solid state physics)
 Slightly Enriched Uranium
 Special Evidence Unit

SF
 SF
 (s) Fleet Submarine (retired US Navy hull classification)
 (i) San Francisco
 Science fiction
 (s) South Africa (FIPS 10-4 country code)
 (i) Speculative fiction
 Special Forces
 SFA
 (i) Sales force automation
 Saturated fatty acid
 Scottish Football Association
 Stephen F. Austin (State University)
 Sudan Football Association
 SFE
 (i) Supercritical fluid extraction
 Sydney Futures Exchange
 SFF – (i) Standard File Format
 sf&f – (i) Science fiction & fantasy
 SFM – Switch to Facebook Mode, i.e. to message someone on Facebook instead of texting as it is less disruptive in the sense of the phone not making sound or vibrating, for a period of time
 SFOB – (i) Special Forces Operations Base
 SFOR – (p) UN Stabilisation Force (in Bosnia and Herzegovina)
 SFU – (i) Simon Fraser University (Canada)

SG
 sg – (s) Sango language (ISO 639-1 code)
 Sg – (s) Seaborgium
 SG
 (s) Senegal (FIPS 10-4 country code)
 Singapore (ISO 3166 digram)
 Snow Grains (METAR Code)
 (i) Study Group
 SGC
 (i) Server Gated Cryptography
 (p) Stargate Command
 SGD – (s) Singapore dollar (ISO 4217 currency code)
 SGML – (i) Standard Generalized Markup Language
 SGP – (s) Singapore (ISO 3166 trigram)
 SGS
 (s) South Georgia and the South Sandwich Islands (ISO 3166 trigram)
 (i) Svalbard Ground Station (Landsat)
 Société Générale de Surveillance

SH
 sh – (s) Serbo-Croatian language (ISO 639-1 code)
 SH
 (s) Saint Helena (ISO 3166 digram)
 (p) SONATRACH (Algerian petroleum company)
 Shanghai
 SHAC
 (a) Stop Huntingdon Animal Cruelty
 Student Health Action Coalition
 SHAPE – (a) Supreme Headquarters Allied Powers Europe
 SHF – (i) Super High Frequency
 SHN – (s) Saint Helena (ISO 3166 trigram)
 SHO – (a) Showtime (see also sho.com)
 SHOALS – (a) Scanning Hydrographic Operational Airborne Lidar Survey
 SHORAD – (p) Short Range Air Defence
 SHORADEZ – (p) SHORAD Engagement Zone
 SHP – (s) Saint Helena pound (ISO 4217 currency code)
 SHRA – (s) Rain Showers (METAR Code)
 SHSN – (s) Snow Showers (METAR Code)

SI
 si – (s) Sinhala language (ISO 639-1 code)
 Si – (s) Silicon
 SI
 (s) Slovenia (ISO 3166 and FIPS 10-4 country code digram)
 (i) Socialist International
 Sports Illustrated
 Système International (French, International System of Units)
 SIA – (s) Singapore Airlines (ICAO code)
 SIA – (i) Survivors of Incest Anonymous
 SIAM – (i) Society for Industrial and Applied Mathematics
 SIC – (a) Standard Industrial Classification
 SICS – (a/i) Swedish Institute of Computer Science
 SIDS – (a) Sudden infant death syndrome
 SIDU – (i) select, insert, delete, update. See Create, read, update and delete
 SIF – (i) Selective Identification Feature
 SIFF – (i) Successor IFF
 SIG
 (i) Schweizerische Industrie Gesellschaft (German, "Swiss Industry Company"). See also SIG Sauer, a firearms manufacturer spun off from the aforementioned company in 2000.
 (p) .signature (UNIX shell/Internet standard file name)
 (a/i) Special Interest Group
 (a/i) Strasbourg Illkirch-Graffenstaden Basket (French basketball club)
 SIGCAT – (a) Special Interest Group for CD-ROM Applications and Technology
 SIGINT – (p) Signals Intelligence
 SIGMET – (p) Significant Meteorological Information
 SIIT
 (i) Saskatchewan Indian Institute of Technologies (Canadian university)
 Sirindhorn International Institute of Technology (Thai university)
 Stateless IP/ICMP Translation algorithm
 SIMAC – (a) Semantic Interaction with Music Audio Contents
 SIMLAS – (p) Soldier Integrated Multipurpose Laser System
 SIMM – (a) Single In-line Memory Module
 SIMNET – (p) SIMulator NETwork, later SIMulation NETwork
 SIMNET-D - (p) SIMNET-Developmental
 SIMP – (a) Strongly Interacting Massive Particle
 SIMPLE
 (a) Satellite Interactive Multimedia Platform for Low-cost Earth stations
 (p) Savings Incentive Match Plan for Employees (as used in SIMPLE IRA)
 (a) Standard Interface for Multiple Platform Link Evaluation (NATO STANAG 5602)
 sin – (s) Sinhala language (ISO 639-2 code)
 SIN – (a) Social insurance number (Canada)
 SINCGARS – (p) SINgle Channel Ground and Airborne Radio System
 SIP
 (i) Session Initiation Protocol
 State Implementation Plan
 System Improvement Program
 Systematic investment plan
 SIPP – (a) Self-Invested Personal Pension
 Siri – (a) Speech Interpretation and Recognition Interface (Apple iOS software)
 SIRI – (a) Service Interface for Real Time Information
 SIRS — (a) Systemic inflammatory response syndrome
 SiS – (i) Silicon Integrated Systems
 SIS – (i) UK Secret Intelligence Service (also known as MI6)
 SISO
 (a) Simulation Interoperability Standards Organization
 Society of Independent Show Organizers
 SIW – (i) Simulation Interoperability Workshop
 SIYSS – (i) Stockholm International Youth Science Seminar

SJ
 SJ
 (s) Svalbard and Jan Mayen (ISO 3166 digram)
 (i) Societas Iesu (Latin: The Society of Jesus, the Jesuit order)
 (i) Statens Järnvägar (Swedish State Railways)
 SJA – (i) Staff Judge Advocate (military law)
 SJC – (i) Supreme Judicial Court of Massachusetts (note: the highest court in the state of Maine is also called the Supreme Judicial Court)
 SJM – (s) Svalbard and Jan Mayen (ISO 3166 trigram)

SK
 sk – (s) Slovak language (ISO 639-1 code)
 SK
 (s) Saskatchewan (postal symbol)
 Slovakia (ISO 3166 digram)
 SKC – (s) Clear Sky (METAR Code)
 SKK – (s) Slovak koruna (ISO 4217 currency code)
 SKM – (s) Sikkim (ISO 3166 trigram; obsolete 1975)
 SKU -  (i) Stock Keeping Unit

SL
 sl – (s) Slovene language (ISO 639-1 code)
 SL
 (s) Sierra Leone (ISO 3166 and FIPS 10-4 country code digram)
 (i) Start Line
 SLA
 (i) Service Level Agreement
 Symbionese Liberation Army
 SLAA – (i) Sex and Love Addicts Anonymous
 SLAC – (a) Stanford Linear Accelerator Center
 SLAN – (i) sine loco, anno, nomine (Latin, "without place, year, or name")
 SLAPP – (a) Strategic lawsuit against public participation
 SLB – (s) Solomon Islands (ISO 3166 trigram)
 SLBM – (i) Sea/Submarine-Launched Ballistic Missile
 SLC – (i) Scan Line Corrector
 SLE – (s) Sierra Leone (ISO 3166 trigram)
 SLI/SLi
 (i/s) Scan-Line Interleave
 Scalable Link Interface
 SLIT – (p) SubLingual ImmunoTherapy
 slk – (s) Slovak language (ISO 639-2 code)
 SLL – (s) Sierra Leone leone (ISO 4217 currency code)
 SLO – (s) Slovenia (IOC trigram, but not FIFA or ISO 3166)
 SLOC
 (a) Sea Lines Of Communication
 Source Lines Of Code
 SLORC – (a) State Law and Order Restoration Council (of Burma)
 SLP
 (i) Sea Level Pressure
 (i) Super Long Play
 slph – (s) Standard litre per hour (air flow)
 slpm – (s) Standard litre per minute (air flow)
 slps – (s) Standard litre per second (air flow)
 SLR – (i) Single-Lens Reflex (camera)
 SLT
 (i) Single Lens Translucent
 (i) Speech and language therapist
 (i) Solid Logic Technology (electronics)
 Swing Landing Trainer (paratroops)
 (i) Secondary lymphoid tissue
 slv – (s) Slovenian language (ISO 639-2 code)
 SLV – (s) El Salvador (ISO 3166 trigram)

SM
 sm – (s) Samoan language (ISO 639-1 code)
 Sm – (s) Samarium
 SM
 (i) Sado-Masochism
 (s) San Marino (ISO 3166 and FIPS 10-4 country code digram)
 (i) Soldier's Manual
 (s) Submarine Minelayer (US Navy hull classification)
 SMA – (i) Scan Mirror Assembly
 SMART - many different meanings
 SMASS – (a) Small Main-Belt Asteroid Spectroscopic Survey
 SMCT – (i) Soldier's Manual of Common Tasks
 SMD – (i) Surface Mount Device
 SMDR – (i) Station Message Detail Recording
 sme – (s) Northern Sami language (ISO 639-2 code)
 SME
 (i) Scan Mirror Electronics
 Subject Matter Expert
 SMG
 (i) Sequential Motorsport Gearbox
 SubMachine Gun
 SMH – (a) Shaking My Head
 SMil – (a) Sadomasochisterne i landet (Danish SM organisation)
 SMIL – (a) Synchronized Multimedia Integration Language
 smo – (s) Samoan language (ISO 639-2 code)
 SMP – (i) Standard Military Pattern
 SM&R – (i) Source, Maintenance, and Recoverability
 SMR – (s) San Marino (ISO 3166 trigram)
 SMS – many, including: Short message service; see entry
 SMTP – (i) Simple Mail Transfer Protocol
 SMU – (i) Southern Methodist University
 SMX
 many, including: (i) Server Macro Expansion
 (p) Solaris MINIX
 (p) Spatial multiplexing
 (p) Sulfamethoxazole; see entry
 SMZ
 many, including: (i) Silver Mt. Zion
 (p) Sulfamethazine
 (p) Sulfamethoxazole; see entry

SN
 sn – (s) Shona language (ISO 639-1 code)
 Sn – (s) Tin (Latin Stannum)
 SN
 (s) Senegal (ISO 3166 digram)
 Singapore (FIPS 10-4 country code)
 Snow (METAR Code)
 SuperNova
 Screen Name
 sna – (s) Shona language (ISO 639-2 code)
 SNAFU – (a) "Situation Normal — All Fouled/Fucked Up"
 SNAP – (p) Supernova/Acceleration Probe
 SNCB – (i) Société nationale des chemins de fer de Belgique (French for "Belgian Railways National Society", NMBS in Dutch)
 SNCF – (i) Société nationale des chemins de fer français (French for "French Railways National Society")
 snd – (s) Sindhi language (ISO 639-2 code)
 SND – (i) Standard Nomenclature Database
 SNE – (i) Synthetic Natural Environment
 SNES – Super Nintendo Entertainment System
 SNÉTA – (a) Syndicat national pour l'étude des transports aériens (French for "Aerial transport Study National Syndicate", 1919–1923)
 SNG – (i) Satellite News Gathering (television)
 SNL 
 (i) Saturday Night Live (television)
 (i) Società Navigazione del Lago di Lugano
 SNM – (i) Special Nuclear Material
 SNMP – (i) Simple Network Management Protocol
 SNOBOL – (p) StriNg Oriented symBOlic Language
 SNP – (i) Single-nucleotide polymorphism
 SNR
 (i) SuperNova Remnant
 Signal-to-Noise Ratio
 SNRI – (i) Serotonin-Norepinephrine Reuptake Inhibitor
 SNS – (i) Spallation Neutron Source
 SNU – (i) Solar Neutrino Unit

SO
 so – (s) Somali language (ISO 639-1 code)
 SO
 (i) Shared Object (Unix)
 Sheriff's Office
 Significant other
 (s) Somalia (ISO 3166 and FIPS 10-4 country code digram)
 SOA
 (a) service-oriented architecture
 (a) Society of Actuaries
 (i) State of the art
 SOAP
 (a) Simple Object Access Protocol
 Supplemental Offer and Acceptance Program (U.S. medical residency matching)
 SOB
 (i) Son Of a Bitch
 Same Old Bullshit
 SOC – (a) Sector Operations Centre
 Soccsksargen – (p) South Cotabato, Cotabato, Sultan Kudarat, Sarangani, General Santos (a region in the Philippines; pronounced "sock-sar-gen")
 SOCOM – (p) (U.S.) Special Operations Command
 SoCon – (p) Southern Conference (U.S. college sports)
 SOD
 (i/a) School Of Dentistry
 Statement Of Difference(s)
 Statement Of Direction
 Statement Of Documentation
 Statement Of Duty/Duties
 SOE
 (i) Secret Of Evermore
 Special Operations Executive (WWII British organization)
 State Of Emissions (EW)
 SOF
 (a/i) Special Operations Force(s)
 Status of Forces
 SOFIA – (a) Stratospheric Observatory For Infrared Astronomy
 SOGAT
 (a) Society of Graphical and Allied Trades
 Former British printing union
 SOHC – (i) Single-OverHead-Cam engine
 SOHO – (p) Solar and Heliospheric Observatory
 SOI – (i) Signal Operating Instruction
 SOL – (i) Shit Out of Luck
 SOLIS – (i) Synoptic Optical Long-term Investigations of the Sun
 som – (s) Somali language (ISO 639-2 code)
 SOM
 (a) Simulation Object Model
 (s) Somalia (ISO 3166 trigram)
 Sonar – (p) SOund Navigation And Ranging
 SOP
 (i) Standing/Standard Operating Procedure
 State of Play
 SOR
 (i) State Of Readiness
 Statement Of Requirements
 SOS
 (s) Somali shilling (ISO 4217 currency code)
 Save Our Souls
 SOSTAR – (a) Stand-Off Surveillance and Target Acquisition Radar
 sot – (s) Sotho language (ISO 639-2 code)
 SOUTHAG – (p) Southern Army Group
 SOUTHCOM – (p) (U.S.) Southern Command
 SOV – (i) Single Occupant Vehicle
 SOW – (i) Statement Of Work
 SOWHAT – (p) RESNA Subcommittee on Wheelchairs and Transportation
 SOX – (p) Sarbanes–Oxley Act

SP
 Sp
 (p) Special
 Spring tide (nautical charts)
 (i) sine prole (Latin, "without offspring")
 SP
 (i) Security Police
 Self-Propelled
 Shore Patrol
 (s) Spain (FIPS 10-4 country code)
 (i) Start Point
 Strong Point
 spa – (s) Spanish language (ISO 639-2 code)
SPA - Single Page Application
 SPAAG – (a) Self-Propelled Anti-Aircraft Gun
SPAC - Saratoga Performing Arts Center
 SPACECOM – (p) (U.S.) Space Command
 SPAL – (a) Società Polisportiva Ars et Labor ("Art & Labor Sports Club", with the "SP" from Italian and "AL" from Latin), Italian football club
 Spaser – (a) Surface plasmon amplification by stimulated emission of radiation
 SPC – (i) Secretariat of the Pacific Community
SPCA - Society for the Prevention of Cruelty to Animals
 SPCO – (i) Single-Pole Change Over
 SPD
 (i) Shimano Pedaling Dynamics
 Sozialdemokratische Partei Deutschlands (Social Democratic Party of Germany)
 SPDT – (i) Single-Pole Double-Throw
 SPEAC – (a) Stop Primate Experiments at Cambridge (later became SPEAK)
 SPECTRE – SPecial Executive for Counter-intelligence, Terrorism, Revenge and Extortion
 S.P.E.A.R. - Spontaneous Protection Enabling Accelerated Response
 SPEED – (a) Subsistence Preparation by Electronic Energy Diffusion (early military microwave oven)
 SPIE – (i) originally the Society for Photo-Optical Instrumentation Engineers ("SPIE – The International Society for Optical Engineering" 1981–2007, "SPIE" since 2007)
 SPL
 (i) Scottish Premier League
 Superior Parietal Lobule
 Sound pressure level
 SPM – (s) Saint Pierre and Miquelon (ISO 3166 trigram)
 SPOD – (a/i) Sea Port of Debarkation
 SPOE – (a/i) Sea Port of Embarkation
 SPOT – (a) Satellite pour l'observation de la Terre (French, "Satellite for Earth Observation")
 SPQR – (i) Senatus Populusque Romanus (Latin "The Senate and the People of Rome")
 sps – (i) sine prole superstite (Latin, "without surviving issue")
 SPS – (i) Standard Positioning Service (GPS)
 SPST – (i) Single-Pole Single-Throw

SQ
 sq – (s) Albanian language (ISO 639-1 code)
 SQ – (i) Sound Quality
 SQ – (i) Standard Quality
 sqi – (s) Albanian language (ISO 639-2 code)
 SQL – (i/a) Structured Query Language ("seek-well")
SQS - Amazon Simple Queue Service
 SQUID – (p) Superconducting QUantum Interference Device
 SQOR – (p) Succinate:Quinone OxidoReductase, enzyme superfamily including quinone-linked succinate dehydrogenase and fumarate reductase

SR
 sr – (s) Serbian language (ISO 639-1 code)
 Sr – (s) Strontium
 SR
 (i) Sound Reinforcement
 Supply Route
 (s) Suriname (ISO 3166 digram)
 (i) Sveriges Radio (Swedish Radio Ltd)
 SR – (i) Sustained release of a drug
 SRAM
 (p) Scott (King), Ray (Day), SAM (Patterson) — founders of bicycle component manufacturer SRAM Corporation
 (p) Static Random Access Memory ("ess-ram")
 SR-ATGW – (i) Short-Range Anti-Tank Guided Weapon
 SRB – (i) Solid Rocket Booster
 SRBM – (i) Short-Range Ballistic Missile (cf. IRBM, ICBM)
 SRC – (i) Scheduled Removal Component
 srd – (s) Sardinian language (ISO 639-2 code)
 SRD
 (i) Science Requirements Document
 (s) Surinam dollar (ISO 4217 currency code)
 SREL – (i) Savannah River Ecology Laboratory
 SRG
 (i) SACEUR Rover Group
 Special Republican Guard
 SRGW – (i) Short-Range Guided Weapon
 SRL
 (i) Savannah River Laboratory
 Single Rocket Launcher
 Survival Research Labs
 SRM – (i) Specified Risk Material(s)
 srp – (s) Serbian language (ISO 639-2 code)
 SRS – (i) Savannah River Site
 SRTP – (i) [Secure Real-time Transport Protocol]

SS
 ss – (s) Swati language (ISO 639-1 code)
 SS
 (s) Sand Storm (METAR Code)
 (p) Schutzstaffel (German, roughly "Protection Squadron"; Nazi elite Praetorian guard)
 (i) U.S. Secret Service
 Spanish Ship
 Stainless steel
 Stockholm Skins
 (s) Submarine (US Navy hull classification)
 (i) Super Sport
 Surface-to-Surface (missile)
 SSA
 (s) Cargo Submarine (US Navy hull classification)
 (i) Social Security Administration (U.S.)
 Statistics South Africa
 SSB – (a) Single-sideband modulation
 SSB – (i) Sacramento Sustainable Business
 SSBN – (s) Nuclear-Powered Ballistic Missile Submarine (US Navy hull classification)
 SSC
 (i) Safe, Sane, Consensual (SM phrase)
 Secondary Somatosensory Cortex
 Smaller-Scale Contingency
 U.S. Army Soldiers System Center (Natick, Massachusetts)
 Superconducting Super Collider
 SSCCATAGAPP – Singles, Seniors, Childless Couples, And Teens And Gays Against Parasitic Parents (fictional organization from The Simpsons)
 SSD
 (i) Solid-state drive
 (s) South Sudan (ISO 3166 trigram)
 SSDC – (i) U.S. Space and Strategic Defense Command
 SSDD
 (i) Same Shit, Different Day
 Single-Sided Double-Density (floppy disk)
 SSE
 (s) South South-East
 (i) Streaming SIMD Extensions
 SSG – (s) Guided Missile Submarine (retired US Navy hull classification)
 SSGN – (s) Nuclear-Powered Guided Missile Submarine (US Navy hull classification)
 SSH – (i) Saffir-Simpson Hurricane scale
 SSK – (s) Hunter-Killer Submarine (retired US Navy hull classification)
 SSKP – (i) Single-Shot Kill Probability
 SSL – (i) Secure Sockets Layer
 SSM – (i) Surface-to-Surface (Guided) Missile
 SSN
 (s) Nuclear-Powered Attack Submarine (US Navy hull classification)
 (i) SIM Serial Number
 Social Security Number (U.S.)
 Socialist Solidarity Network
 Subsystem number (SCCP, SS7)
 SSNW – (i) Same Shit, New Wrapping
 SSO – (s) Submarine Oiler (retired US Navy hull classification)
 SSP – (s) Submarine Transport (retired US Navy hull classification)
 SSR
 (s) Radar Picket Submarine (retired US Navy hull classification)
 (i) Solid State Recorder
 SSRI
 (i) Selective Serotonin Reuptake Inhibitor
 Social Systems Research Institute
 SSRN
 (i) Social Science Research Network
 (s) Nuclear-Powered Radar Picket Submarine (retired US Navy hull classification)
 SSS
 (i) Siding Spring Survey
 Side Side Side (an acronym for remembering congruent triangles)
 (i) Sigue Sigue Sputnik (band)
 S/SSM – (i) Surface-to-Subsurface Missile
 SST
 (i) SuperSonic Transport
 (s) Training Submarine (US Navy hull classification)
 Saturated Suction Temperature (refrigeration cycles)
 SSTO – (i) Single-Stage To Orbit
 SSV – (i) Soft-Skinned Vehicle (i.e., unarmoured)
 ssw – (s) Swati language (ISO 639-2 code)
 SSW – (s) South South-West

ST
 st – (s) Sotho language (ISO 639-1 code)
 ST
 (s) Saint Lucia (FIPS 10-4 country code)
 São Tomé and Príncipe (ISO 3166 digram)
 STA
 (i) Scheduled Time of Arrival
 Surveillance and Target Acquisition
 STAG – (a) (U.S.) Strategy and Tactics Group
 STAGE – (a) Scenario Toolkit And Generation Environment
 STANAG – (p) (NATO) Standardisation Agreement
 STAR
 (a) Scientific and Technical Aerospace Reports (NASA)
 Simulation of Tactical Alternative Responses
 Special Threat Analysis and Recognition
 STAT
 (a) Signal Transducers and Activators of Transcription (cell biology)
 Special Tertiary Admissions Test (Australia)
 STB - Surface Transportation Board
 STC – (i) Superior Temporal Cortex
 S&TCD – (i) CERDEC Space and Terrestrial Communications Directorate
 STD
 (s) São Tomé and Príncipe dobra (ISO 4217 currency code)
 (i) Sexually Transmitted Disease
 STDM – (i) Statistical Time Division Multiplexing
 STEM
 (a) Scanning transmission electron microscopy
 Science, technology, engineering, and mathematics
 (p) Spatiaotemporal Epidemiological Modeler (IBM-developed software)
 STENTOR – (p) Satellite de télécommunications pour expérimenter de nouvelles technologies en orbite (French, "Orbital New Technology Experimental Telecommunications Satellite")
 STFU 
 (i) Southern Tenant Farmers Union
 Stuff You
 "Shut the fuck up!"'
 STH – Sonic The Hedgehog
 STI
 (i) Sexually Transmitted Infection
 Subaru Tecnica International
 STK – (i) Satellite Tool Kit
 STM – (i) Short Term Memory
 STOL – (i) Short Take-Off and Landing
 STOVL – (i) Short Take-Off and Vertical Landing
 STP
 (s) São Tomé and Príncipe (ISO 3166 trigram)
 (i) Standard Temperature and Pressure
 STR – (i) Short Tandem Repeat (DNA analysis)
 STRATCOM – (p) United States Strategic Command
 STRICOM
 (p) U.S. Army Simulation, Training & Instrumentation Command (1992–)
 Strike Command (1962–1971)
 STRIVE – (a) Synthetic Tactical Real-time Interactive Virtual Environment
 STSM – (i) Senior Technical Staff Member
 Stuka – (p) Sturzkampfflugzeug (German WWII dive bomber)

SU
 su – (s) Sundanese language (ISO 639-1 code)
 SU
 (s) Soviet Union (ISO 3166 digram; obsolete 1992)
 Sudan (FIPS 10-4 country code)
 SUB – (i) Student Union Building
 SuD – (a) Subject under Discussion
 SUDC – Swedish United Dawah Center, a salafist Islamic organisation in Sweden
 SUI
 (a) Sonic user interface
 (s) Switzerland (IOC and FIFA trigram, but not ISO 3166)
 SUK – Start Up Kit
 sun – (s) Sundanese language (ISO 639-2 code)
 SUN – (s)  
 Soviet Union (ISO 3166 trigram; obsolete 1992) 
 Stanford University Network that led to Sun Microsystems
 SUNY – (a) State University of New York (usually pronounced "sue-knee")
 SUR – (s) Suriname (ISO 3166 trigram)
 SURTASS – (p) Surveillance Towed Array Sensor System
 SUSAT – (a) Sight Unit Small Arms, Trilux
 SUV – (i) Sport Utility Vehicle

SV
 sv – (s) Swedish language (ISO 639-1 code)
 SV
 (s) El Salvador (ISO 3166 digram)
 (p) Sportverein (German for "Sport Association", as in Hamburger SV and SV Werder Bremen)
 SVC – (i) Secondary Visual Cortex
 SvD – (p) Svenska Dagbladet (Swedish newspaper)
 SVD
 (i) Singular Value Decomposition
 Snaiperskaya Vintovka Dragunova (Снайперская винтовка Драгунова, Russian for "Dragunov Sniper Rifle")
 SVG – (i) Scalable Vector Graphics
 SVK – (s) Slovakia (ISO 3166 trigram)
 SVM
 (p) Stroboscopic effect Visibility Measure; a measure for assessing a type of temporal light artefacts
 (i) Support Vector Machine (artificial intelligence)
 SVN – (s) Slovenia (ISO 3166 and FIFA trigram)
 SVO – (i) subject–verb–object
 SVR – (i) Sluzhba Vneshney Razvedki (Служба Внешней Разведки, Russian for "Foreign Intelligence Service")

SW
 sw – (s) Swahili language (ISO 639-1 code)
 SW
 (s) South-West ordinal direction
 Sweden (FIPS 10-4 country code)
 (a) Shortwave
 Star Wars
 swa – (s) Swahili language (ISO 639-2 code)
 SWA
 (i/a) Secure Web Access
 South-West Asia
 SWAC – (p) Southwestern Athletic Conference
 SWALK – (a) Sealed With A Loving Kiss
 SWAN – (a) System for Wearable Audio Navigation
 SWAP – (a) Surface Waters Acidification Programme
 SWAPO – (a) South-West Africa People's Organisation
 SWAT – (a) Special Weapons And Tactics
 swe – (s) Swedish language (ISO 639-2 code)
 SWE – (s) Sweden (ISO 3166 trigram)
 SWF
 (p) Shockwave Flash file ("swiff")
 Single White Female
 SWG
 (i) Surface Warfare Group
 Symbology Working Group
 SWHR – (i) Society for Women's Health Research
 SWIG – (a) Simplified Wrapper and Interface Generator
 SWIR – (a/i) Short Wave InfraRed ("ss-why-are" or )
 SWLABR – (i) "She Was Like A Bearded Rainbow", a song by the band Cream
 SWORD – (p) Subjective WORkload Dominance
 SWORDS – (a) Special Weapons Observation Reconnaissance Detection System
 SWOT – (a) Strengths, Weaknesses, Opportunities, Threats (mnemonic)
 SWP
 (i) Special Working Party ("swipp")
 Systematic Westing Plan (a plan of periodic westing of shares or mutual funds worth a fixed amount of money)
 Skill with prize (UK pub quiz machines — quality titles include: Pub Quiz, Quiz City, Frog in a Liquidizer, Who Wants To Win a Tenner?)
 SWT – (i) Sea Water Tank
 SWV – (i) Sisters With Voices (American female R&B vocal group)
 SWZ – (s) Swaziland (ISO 3166 trigram)

SX
 SX – (i) Sonic X SXM
 (s) Sint Maarten (ISO 3166 trigram)
 (i) Stream X-Machine

SY
 SY – (s) Syria (ISO 3166 and FIPS 10-4 country code digram)
 SYC – (s) Seychelles (ISO 3166 trigram)
 SYLK – Microsoft 'Symbolic Link' data file format
 SYP – (s) Syrian pound (ISO 4217 currency code)
 SYR – (s) Syria (ISO 3166 trigram)
 Syriza – (p) Synaspismós Rizospastikís Aristerás'' (Greek Συνασπισμός Ριζοσπαστικής Αριστεράς, "Coalition of the Radical Left")
 SysML – (p) System Modeling Language
 Sysop – (p) System Operator

SZ
 SZ
 (s) Swaziland (ISO 3166 digram)
 Switzerland (FIPS 10-4 country code)
 SZL – (s) Swaziland lilangeni (ISO 4217 currency code)

References

Acronyms S